Long Hundred may refer to:
 Lång Hundred, a district in Sweden
 The long hundred or the great hundred, usually the number 120